The Slovakia men's national tennis team represents Slovakia in Davis Cup tennis competition and are governed by the Slovak Tennis Association.

Slovakia finished as runners-up in 2005, losing 3–2 to Croatia in the final. They currently compete in the Europe/Africa Zone of Group I.  They last competed in the World Group in 2006.

Current team
Players that were nominated for any Davis Cup tie in the last year. Statistics include the results of the tie against Hungary.

Source:

Rankings as of: Feb 7, 2017

History
Slovakia competed in its first Davis Cup in 1994.  Slovak players had previously played for Czechoslovakia.

Following the 2005 Davis Cup World Group competition, the International Tennis Federation (ITF) announced that Karol Beck, one of the players for Slovakia, had tested positive for the beta agonist clenbuterol during the semifinal against Argentina, which Slovakia won 4–1.

Recent performances

1990s

2000s

2010s

2020s

References

External links

Davis Cup teams
Davis Cup
Davis Cup